An Chang-nam (19 March 1901 – 2 April 1930) was the first Korean aviator to fly a plane within the korean peninsula.

Early life
Born in 19 March 1901 and raised in Seoul, he is believed to have been inspired to learn to fly after having seen an aerobatics demonstration by American pilot Art Smith in 1916 or 1917. However, his beginnings was less than honorable: after stealing his stepmother's money, he ran away from home. He travelled to Japan where he attended a driving school, which he successfully graduated.

Career
In 1920, he graduated from Japan's Okuri Aviation School in Susaki (present-day Kōtō, Tokyo). He passed his examinations to obtain a basic pilot's permit the following year. 

Though it was not the first public plane flight in Korea, An's flight on the Yeouido island was attended by roughly 50,000 people. On his homecoming flight to visit Korea in December 1922, he landed at the same airport he took off in.

Upon his return to Japan, he worked as a flight instructor; however, after he witnessed the massacre of Koreans in Japan in the aftermath of the 1 September 1923 Great Kantō earthquake, he became resolved to fight against Japanese rule over Korea, and in 1924 secretly went into exile in China. There, he joined the infantry of Guo Songling's army; afterwards, he lived in Beijing, becoming active in the Korean independence movement there. At the introduction of Lyuh Woon-Hyung, he joined Yen Hsi-shan's army in 1926 and relocated to Taiyuan, Shanxi, where he became principal of the Shanxi Aviation Academy. He lived there until his death on 2 April 1930, when he crashed his plane in bad weather while returning to the airport after an unplanned flight. He was posthumously awarded South Korea's Order of Merit for National Foundation in 2003.

See also
Kwon Ki-ok
Seo Wal-bo

References

External links 
 The An Chang-nam Memorial Society
 Entry for An Chang-nam on Empas

1901 births
1930 deaths
Aviation pioneers
Korean aviators
Korean expatriates in China
People from Seoul
Aviators killed in aviation accidents or incidents in China
Recipients of the Order of Merit for National Foundation
Victims of aviation accidents or incidents in 1930